Niyi Akinmolayan  is a Nigerian filmmaker and director  and one of Nollywood’s most successful hitmakers. Five of his films rank in the top 50 highest grossing Nigerian films: The Wedding Party 2 (2017) Chief Daddy (2018), Prophetess (2021), My Village People (2021), and The Set Up (2019).  He is also the founder and Creative Director of Anthill Studios, a media production facility. In January 2022, Anthill Studios signed a multi-year deal with Amazon Prime Video to become the exclusive global streaming home for Anthill’s slate of cinema releases following their theatrical runs in Nigeria.

Early life
Akinmolayan was born on 3 November 1982. Akinmolayan is from Ondo State, South West Nigeria and is of Yoruba descent. He began a degree in engineering at the Yaba College of Technology.

Early career
At the start of his professional career, Akinmolayan worked as a graphic designer, website designer, and as an apprentice to Nollywood filmmakers.  During that time, he began to hone his skills in video editing, animations, after effects and visual effects.
 
His debut film titled Kajola, released in 2010, was an experiment in visual effects, but was panned by filmmakers and critics alike. Akinmolayan set up his production company, Anthill Productions in 2008, which provided the visual effects for the movie Kajola.

Later career
In 2014, he directed the Nigerian dance movie Make a Move which starred Ivie Okujaye, Tina Mba, Beverly Naya, Wale Adebayo, Victor Godfery, Helga Sosthenes and Eno Ekpenyong. The movie was nominated for the 2015 Africa Magic Viewers Choice Awards for Best Movie (Drama).

In 2015, Akinmolayan also directed the movies Falling featuring Adesua Etomi, Desmond Elliot and Blossom Chukwujekwu, and Out of Luck which featured Linda Ejiofor, Tope Tedela and Jide Kosoko.The film went on to earn Akinmolayan a nomination for Best Director at the 2016 Nigeria Entertainment Awards and lead actress Adesua Etomi, won the award for Best Actress at the 2016 Africa Magic Viewers Choice Awards.

In December 2016, Akinmolayan released a short film titled PlayThing a 3D animated movie, which premiered at the FilmOne IMAX cinema in Lagos to rave reviews.

In 2017, his movie The Arbitration featuring O.C Ukeje and Adesua Etomi was screened at the Toronto International Film Festival. Following the success of The Arbitration, Akinmolayan began a competition on his blog for prospective writers, receiving over 300 entries, which led to the production of the short film Room 315.

In 2017, due to the successful reception of Plaything, Akinmolayan produced an animated series in collaboration with Friesland Campina WAMCO Nigeria Plc, titled "Adventures of Lola and Chuchu". In 2019, Akinmolayan executive produced Malika: Warrior Queen, a Nigerian animated film based on the graphic novel from Roye Okupe, writer and CEO of YouNeek Studios.

Filmography
Selected Filmography

References 

Living people
1982 births
Yoruba filmmakers
Yaba College of Technology alumni
Nigerian film producers
Nigerian film directors
People from Ondo State
Nigerian media personalities
Nigerian animators